Larry Leach can mean:

 Larry Leach (ice hockey), Canadian ice hockey player
 Larry Leach (botanist), Rhodesian botanist